Emmanuel Ebiede (born 27 March 1978) is a Nigerian former professional footballer who played as an attacking midfielder.

Career
Ebiede joined Belgian First Division side SC Eendracht Aalst at the age of 16.

In 1997 he moved to SC Heerenveen of the Dutch Eredivisie.

References

External links
 
 
 

Living people
1978 births
Sportspeople from Port Harcourt
Nigerian footballers
Footballers from Rivers State
Association football midfielders
Nigeria international footballers
Belgian Pro League players
Eredivisie players
UAE Pro League players
Israeli Premier League players
Liga Leumit players
Sharks F.C. players
S.C. Eendracht Aalst players
SC Heerenveen players
Al Jazira Club players
Al-Wasl F.C. players
Al Dhafra FC players
Al Ain FC players
F.C. Ashdod players
Maccabi Petah Tikva F.C. players
Hapoel Bnei Lod F.C. players
Nigerian expatriate footballers
Nigerian expatriate sportspeople in Belgium
Expatriate footballers in Belgium
Nigerian expatriate sportspeople in the Netherlands
Expatriate footballers in the Netherlands
Nigerian expatriate sportspeople in the United Arab Emirates
Expatriate footballers in the United Arab Emirates
Nigerian expatriate sportspeople in Israel
Expatriate footballers in Israel